Cybocephalus nigritulus is a species of sap, bark and fungus beetles in the family Cybocephalidae. It is found in North America. It can grow to be 1.0 mm to 1.55 mm in size.

References

Further reading

 
 
 
 
 
 

Cucujoidea
Articles created by Qbugbot
Beetles described in 1863